The Green Bird (German: Der grüne Vogel) is a 1980 West German drama film directed by István Szabó and starring Hannelore Elsner, Péter Andorai and Krystyna Janda.

Cast
 Hannelore Elsner as Dr.Renate Winter-Ewald
 Péter Andorai as Jan Widuchowski
 Krystyna Janda as Katzka Widuchowski
 Danuta Szaflarska as Polnische Professorin
 Johanna Elbauer as Barbara
 Rolf von Sydow as Deutscher Professor
 Andreas Briegel as Dr. Werner Ewald
 Angela Jaffé as Annette Ewald, Renates Kind

References

Bibliography 
 Hans-Michael Bock & Tim Bergfelder. The Concise Cinegraph: An Encyclopedia of German Cinema. Berghahn Books, 2009.
 Ewa Mazierska & Michael Goddard. Polish Cinema in a Transnational Context. Boydell & Brewer, 2014.

External links 
 

1980 films
1980 drama films
German drama films
West German films
1980s German-language films
Films directed by István Szabó
1980s German films